Komi Nje (Ԋ ԋ; italics: Ԋ ԋ) is a letter of the Molodtsov alphabet, a variant of Cyrillic. It was used only in the writing of the Komi language in the 1920s.

Its form is similar to the Latin letter Hwair (Ƕ ƕ), but the lowercase form is a small version of the capital letter. 
It corresponds to the Cyrillic letter Nje (Њ њ), and to the Latin digraph Ǌ (Ǌ ǋ ǌ) used in the Croatian and Serbian languages.

Computing codes

See also 
Н н : Cyrillic letter En
Њ њ : Cyrillic letter Nje
Cyrillic characters in Unicode
Ƕ ƕ : Hwair, an artificial Latin letter with a similar resemblance

References

Komi language
Permic languages
Cyrillic letters